Michael O'Farrell may refer to:

 Michael O'Farrell (bishop) (1865–1928), Australian suffragan bishop
 Michael O'Farrell (biker) (1949–1989), American outlaw biker
 Michael J. O'Farrell (1832–1894), Irish-born Roman Catholic bishop; first Bishop of Trenton